Łukasz Miedzik (born 2 April 1991) is a Polish bobsledder. He competed in the four-man event at the 2018 Winter Olympics.

References

External links 
 
 
 

1991 births
Living people
Polish male bobsledders
Olympic bobsledders of Poland
Bobsledders at the 2018 Winter Olympics
Sportspeople from Bydgoszcz